Today Is the Day are a noise rock band from Nashville, Tennessee.

Today Is the Day may also refer to:
 Today Is the Day (film), a 1933 German comedy film directed by Kurt Gerron
 Today Is the Day (Today Is the Day album), 1996
 Today Is the Day (EP), a 2003 EP by Yo La Tengo
 Today Is the Day (Lincoln Brewster album), 2008
 "Today Is the Day", a song by Lovebites from Electric Pentagram
 "Today Is the Day", a two-part episode of Terminator: The Sarah Connor Chronicles

See also
 The Day Today (1994 TV programme), UK TV show
 Today's the Day (disambiguation)